SS Cushag was a coastal cargo vessel owned and operated by the Isle of Man Steam Packet Company between 1920 and 1943.

Dimensions
Length 125'; beam 22'1"; depth 9'2". Cushag had a single steam reciprocating engine which developed 350 i.h.p.; and a design speed of 10 knots.

Service Life
Built by G. Brown & Co. at Greenock in 1908, she was originally named Ardnagrena. Her first owners were James Waterson & Co. of Antrim, who sold her to Humber Steam Coasters Ltd in 1914. Five years later she was sold once more, this time to a London broker, from whom she was purchased by the Isle of Man Steam Packet Company in May 1920, at a cost of £22,000 (equivalent to £).

Small and drawing so little water, she was mostly used for cargo trade in the Island's smaller ports - Port St Mary, Peel, Laxey and Castletown.

After over 20 years service with the Company, she was sold to London agents in January 1943, and then went on to Stornoway on the Isle of Lewis for four years. She transferred to Kirkwall in Orkney in 1947.

Disposal
Cushag register ceases on 20 July 1957, when she was broken up at Grangemouth.

Gallery

References

Bibliography
 Chappell, Connery (1980). Island Lifeline T.Stephenson & Sons Ltd 

Ships of the Isle of Man Steam Packet Company
1908 ships
Steamships of the United Kingdom
Ferries of the Isle of Man
Merchant ships of the United Kingdom
Ships built on the River Clyde